A bequest for a Mass occurs when a person leaves a bequest in their will for a Mass to be said for the repose of their soul.

Legal status
In England after the Reformation such bequests were deemed to be invalid in law as "superstitious" until 1919, when the House of Lords held them to be valid.

In Ireland a judgment of the Court of Chancery in 1823 found that in that country such bequests had always been legally valid.

References

Mass in the Catholic Church
Charity law